Adem Ören (born 8 November 1979 in Amasya, Turkey) is a Turkish professional basketball player. He currently plays for Darüşşafaka S.K.

External links
 TBLStat.net Profile

1979 births
Living people
Beşiktaş men's basketball players
Centers (basketball)
Darüşşafaka Basketbol players
Karşıyaka basketball players
People from Amasya
Power forwards (basketball)
Tofaş S.K. players
Turkish men's basketball players
Türk Telekom B.K. players